The 2009 WAC men's basketball tournament, a part of the 2008-09 NCAA Division I men's basketball season, was held March 10–14 at the Lawlor Events Center in Reno, Nevada. 

Regular season champion Utah State Aggies won the tournament, defeating host Nevada by ten points in the title game.  The Aggies received the Western Athletic Conference's automatic bid to the NCAA tournament; they were seeded eleventh in the West region and lost by a point in the first round to Marquette. 

No other WAC teams were invited to the NCAA or National Invitation Tournament (NIT). Nevada and Boise State
lost in the first round of the CBI, and Idaho advanced to the second round of the CIT.

Bracket

References

External links
Official website of the Western Athletic Conference
WAC Men's Basketball Tournament

WAC men's basketball tournament
Tournament
WAC men's basketball tournament
WAC men's basketball tournament